Miss USA 1975 was the 24th Miss USA pageant, televised live by CBS from Niagara Falls, New York on May 17, 1975.

The pageant was won by Summer Bartholomew (who later went to work with Jim Perry on Sale of the Century on NBC from 1983 to 1989) of California, who was crowned by outgoing titleholder Karen Morrison of Illinois.  Bartholomew was the third woman from California to win the Miss USA title, and went on to place as 2nd runner-up at Miss Universe 1975.

Results

Special awards

Historical significance 
 California wins competition for the third time. 
 Alabama earns the 1st runner-up position for the first time and reached its highest placement since Sylvia Hitchcock won in 1967. Ironically, Hitchcock became the fourth woman from USA to win the Miss Universe title in 1967.
 North Carolina earns the 2nd runner-up position for the first time and surpasses its previous highest placement in 1960.
 Florida earns the 3rd runner-up position for the second time. The last time it placed this was in 1972.
 Texas earns the 4th runner-up position for the second time. The last time it placed this was in 1956.
 States that placed in semifinals the previous year were California, District of Columbia, Florida, Missouri and North Carolina.
 California placed for the nineteenth consecutive year.
 Florida placed for the seventh consecutive year. 
 District of Columbia placed for the sixth consecutive year. 
 Missouri and North Carolina made their second consecutive placement.
 Texas last placed in 1973.
 Hawaii last placed in 1972.
 Kentucky and Virginia last placed in 1971.
 Alabama last placed in 1969.
 Indiana last placed in 1966.
 New Jersey last placed in 1964.
 Illinois breaks an ongoing streak of placements and wins since 1973.
 Arizona breaks an ongoing streak of placements since 1973.
 Louisiana and New York break an ongoing streak of placements since 1972.

Delegates
The Miss USA 1975 delegates were:

 Alabama – Pamela Flowers
 Alaska – Andie Higgins
 Arizona – Sanna Osgood
 Arkansas – Robin Fields
 California – Summer Bartholomew
 Colorado – Amy Long
 Connecticut – Michele Menegay
 Delaware – Sandy McClure
 District of Columbia – Mary Lamond
 Florida – Mary Humes
 Georgia – Diana Goodman
 Hawaii – Lois Wise
 Idaho – Charlene McArthur
 Illinois – Connie Reif
 Indiana – Jo Ellen Berryman
 Iowa – Kathleen Duggan
 Kansas – Robbin Loomas
 Kentucky – Carol Wallace
 Louisiana – Rhonda Shear
 Maine – Denise Hill
 Maryland – Ellen Bowie
 Massachusetts – Rila Posson
 Michigan – Debra Holland
 Minnesota – Dawn Lamotte
 Mississippi – Leigh Cross
 Missouri – Nancy LaRose
 Montana – Suzanne Demier
 Nebraska – Mary Hoth
 Nevada – Madonna Allison
 New Hampshire – Bonnie Gates
 New Jersey – Cathy Russell
 New Mexico – Maxine Whisler
 New York – Sonja Anderson
 North Carolina – Constance Dorn
 North Dakota – Renae Saville
 Ohio – Sandra Kurdas
 Oklahoma – Gayla Bryan
 Oregon – Theresa Favreu
 Pennsylvania – Pat Hurley
 Rhode Island – Marice Love
 South Carolina – Robin Morris
 South Dakota – Lanette Rabenberg
 Tennessee – Shelly Smith
 Texas – Aundie Evers
 Utah – Andrea Felt
 Vermont – Constance Crabtree
 Virginia – Linda McKee
 Washington – Cindy Baxter
 West Virginia – Joyce Myers
 Wisconsin – Rita Patter
 Wyoming – Kim Pring

External links 
 

1975
May 1975 events in the United States
1975 beauty pageants
1975 in New York (state)